Fathabad (also Romanized as Fathābād; also known as Bongeh-ye Fatḩābād, Fatḩābād-e Ḩūmeh, Fatḩābād-e Sardār, and Fath Abad Hoomeh) is a village in Qasemabad Rural District, in the Central District of Rafsanjan County, Kerman Province, Iran. At the 2006 census, its population was 782, in 195 families.

References 

Populated places in Rafsanjan County